U-Boat Prisoner, also known as Dangerous Mists, is a 1944 American film. Direction was credited to Lew Landers. The script was written by Aubrey Wisberg.

Cast
Bruce Bennett as Archie Gibbs
Erik Rolf as Capt. Ganz
John Abbott as Alfonse Lamont
John Wengraf as Gunther Rudehoff

Production
Budd Boetticher said that the film was "an eight day picture". He claims that he was called in to help finish it, as he had with Landers' Submarine Raider.

Boetticher called Landers "a no-talent guy. They called him the "D" director there at Columbia; he just wasn't any good. Whenever they had a picture they didn't really care about, they'd give it to Landers."

References

External links

U Boat Prisoner at TCMDB

1944 films
American war drama films
World War II films made in wartime
Columbia Pictures films
1940s war drama films
American black-and-white films
1944 drama films
Films with screenplays by Aubrey Wisberg
1940s English-language films
Films directed by Lew Landers